The Dorset Football League is a football competition based in England. It is a feeder to the Dorset Premier Football League, which is a level 11 league of the English football league system. Thus, the Dorset Senior League is a level 12 league.

Member clubs 2020-21

Champions

References

External links
FA Full Time page

 
Football leagues in England
Football in Dorset